The Scottish Government Finance and Corporate Services Directorates were a set of directorates of the Scottish Government. They were responsible for delivering ministerial support, human resources, legal services and procurement to the other directorates. In December 2010 these functions were taken on by the Governance and Communities Directorate and the Finance Directorate.

Directorates
 Communications
 HR and Corporate Services
 Office of the Scottish Parliamentary Counsel
 Procurement
 Public Services Reform
 Scottish Government Legal Directorates

External links
Scottish Government Services and Groups

Defunct departments of the Scottish Government
Public finance of Scotland
Government procurement in the United Kingdom
2010 disestablishments in Scotland